The Defense Government governed just the city of Montevideo during the period known as Great Siege of Montevideo (1843–1851). It was led by Joaquín Suárez, while the army was led by Fructuoso Rivera.

Uruguay was experiencing the Guerra Grande, between the two traditional parties Colorado and Blanco. The government of Montevideo survived thanks to the help of the British and the French, as well as the active collaboration of Italian warrior Giuseppe Garibaldi.

See also
 Gobierno del Cerrito
 Great Siege of Montevideo
 Uruguayan Civil War

References

Uruguayan Civil War
History of Montevideo
Colorado Party (Uruguay)